Francelina Cabral (born March 23, 1985) is an East Timorese cross-country cyclist. She competed at the 2016 Summer Olympics in the women's cross-country race, the first Olympic cyclist of any type to compete for East Timor, but she was lapped and did not finish the race. She was the flag bearer for Timor-Leste at the Parade of Nations.

References

External links
 

1985 births
Living people
People from Lautém District
East Timorese female cyclists
Olympic cyclists of East Timor
Cyclists at the 2016 Summer Olympics